Campus Martius station is a QLINE streetcar station in Detroit, Michigan. The station opened for service on May 12, 2017, and is located in Downtown Detroit.

Destinations
 Campus Martius Park
 Compuware World Headquarters
 One Kennedy Square
 1001 Woodward
 Former Hudson's Site
 Merchant's Row

Station
The Campus Martius station is sponsored by the Blue Cross Blue Shield Association. It is heated and feature security cameras and emergency phones. Passenger amenities include Wi-Fi and arrival signs.

See also

Streetcars in North America

References

External links 
 

Tram stops of QLine
Railway stations in the United States opened in 2017